The Bessemer & Lake Erie Railroad Bridge is a truss bridge that carries the Canadian National Railway's  Bessemer and Lake Erie Railroad division across the Allegheny River between the Pittsburgh suburbs of Plum and Harmar Township, Pennsylvania. In 1897, a single-track trestle and viaduct was built on this site; in 1918, the original piers were doubled in width, the current double-tracked structure built alongside, and then slid into place. The original north trestle approach was buried in slag dumped from an adjacent temporary filling trestle.

See also
List of bridges documented by the Historic American Engineering Record in Pennsylvania
List of crossings of the Allegheny River

References

External links

Railroad bridges in Pennsylvania
Bridges over the Allegheny River
Canadian National Railway bridges in the United States
Historic American Engineering Record in Pennsylvania
Bridges in Allegheny County, Pennsylvania
Viaducts in the United States
Steel bridges in the United States